

The THK-2 was a single-seat, single-engine aerobatic trainer aircraft developed in Turkey in 1944 intended as an advanced trainer. It was a conventional, low-wing cantilever monoplane with an elliptical planform and of wooden construction. The cockpit was enclosed and the main units of the tailwheel undercarriage retracted backwards into the wing.

Designed by Polish engineers who had come to Turkey to help establish the Türk Hava Kurumu factory, the first prototype flew in 1944 and the second flew the following year. This led to production in series, but only four further examples were built before the project was abandoned. When THK was taken over by MKEK, this was one of the designs selected for further work. However, although the designation MKEK-2 was allocated, nothing further came of this. The THK-2s were used by the Turkish Air Force in their intended role until the mid-1950s.

Specifications

Notes

References

 
 
 

1940s Turkish military trainer aircraft
Single-engined tractor aircraft
Low-wing aircraft
Turkish Aeronautical Association aircraft